Wendy is a 2020 American fantasy drama film directed by Benh Zeitlin, from a screenplay by Zeitlin and Eliza Zeitlin. The film stars Devin France, Yashua Mack, Gage Naquin, Gavin Naquin, Ahmad Cage, Krzysztof Meyn, and Romyri Ross. It is intended to be a re-imagining of J. M. Barrie's Peter Pan.

Wendy had its world premiere at the Sundance Film Festival on January 26, 2020 and was released on February 28, 2020 by Searchlight Pictures.

Plot 

Wendy Darling lives in the rural South with her waitress mother Angela and twin brothers James and Douglas. Back when James and Douglas (Logan Jones and Luke Jones) were celebrating their seventh birthdays, their next-door neighbor and cousin Thomas Marshall storms outside (on discovering what his future will be) and disappears, with Wendy seeing him being lured into climbing aboard a passing train car by a hooded childlike figure. One night, when the children request a bedtime story, Angela tells them about her life and how she was forced to give up on her dreams in order to raise a family. Wendy wonders whether the same thing will happen to her.

The next night, as the train passes by their bedroom window, Wendy notices a boy riding on top of the train cars. The three children climb out of their window and join the boy, Peter, who takes them all to a tropical island with an active volcano, which Peter calls "Mother". The island is populated by other children, including their long-lost cousin Thomas, who has not aged a day for over the past seven years. Peter explains that Mother's spirit resides in the volcano and prevents the children from aging, so long as they believe in her. They later discover a large glowing fish, which is Mother's other form with Wendy then secretly coming across a dated photograph of a deceased family of islanders that include Peter and concludes Mother must've saved him from a natural disaster (that killed the other islanders) and shared her powers with Peter making him ageless.

While exploring a capsized boat called the Mañana, Douglas injures his head and disappears from sight. The children search for him without success. Missing his twin brother, James withdraws emotionally and his right hand begins to show signs of age. James becomes afraid and asks Peter to cut the hand off lest he become old. Shocked and disgusted, Wendy pulls James away from the group and they explore the back of the island. They encounter a settlement of "Olds," children who lost faith in Mother and thus began to age normally. Among them is Buzzo, well known by the younger kids as being a former member of their group (who lost his faith in Mother when his best friend died). James, bitter at having to grow up without Douglas, rallies the group to kill and eat Mother's fish form in order to regain their youth. The Olds kidnap the children to use as bait for Mother and repurpose the Mañana as a fishing boat.

While evading the Olds, Wendy and Peter find Douglas alive. They swim to the Mañana, where they find the now elderly James, with a hook in place of his missing right hand. As Peter and Wendy rescue the children, James kills Mother with a harpoon. With Peter and the children mournful and the Olds disheartened, Wendy gets them to all start singing, which inspires Peter and revitalizes the volcano. Wendy and Douglas decide it is time for them to go home plus also bring Thomas back with them to give his family closure (along with two other tag along lost children). Knowing that he cannot go home, James stays to play with Peter as his new “enemy” Captain Hook, thereby allowing him to live out the rest of his days with the spirit of a child. Years later Wendy, now a mother herself, wakes to find her daughter Jane climbing aboard a passing train car with none other than Peter himself, still unchanged by time. Unable to keep up, Wendy comforts herself that Peter will look after her daughter and eventually return Jane back home to Wendy.

Cast 
 Devin France as Wendy Darling
 Tommie Milazzo as Baby Wendy
 Catherine Ott as Teenage Wendy
 Allison Campbell as Adult Wendy
 Yashua Mack as Peter
 Gage Naquin as Douglas Darling
 Logan Jones as Aged 7 Douglas
 John Belloni as Teenage Douglas
 Levy Easterly as Adult Douglas
 Gavin Naquin as James Darling
 Luke Jones as Aged 7 James
 Kevin Pugh as Captain James Hook
 Krzysztof Meyn as Thomas
Weldon Barry as Teenage Thomas
Hunter McGregor as Adult Thomas
 Ahmad Cage as Sweet Heavy
 Romyri Ross as Cudjoe Head
 Lowell Landes as Buzzo
 Shay Walker as Angela Darling
 Cleopatra King Welch as Jane Darling

Production 
In August 2015, it was announced Benh Zeitlin would write and direct the film. Production began in March 2017, with filming taking place in Montserrat.

Release 
In April 2018, Searchlight Pictures acquired North American distribution rights to the film. It had its world premiere at the Sundance Film Festival on January 26, 2020. It was released on February 28, 2020.

Reception

Critical response 
The site's critical consensus reads, "Wendy dares to do something different with its classic source material; unfortunately, the movie's breathtaking visuals are at odds with a flawed take on the story." On Metacritic, the film has a weighted average score of 55 out of 100, based on 36 critics, indicating "mixed or average reviews".

References

External links 
 
 

2020 films
2020 fantasy films
2020 drama films
2020s fantasy drama films
American fantasy drama films
Magic realism films
Films about children
Films about siblings
Films scored by Dan Romer
Films shot in the Caribbean
Peter Pan films
Searchlight Pictures films
TSG Entertainment films
2020s English-language films
2020s American films